Meer, Belgium may refer to:

Places in Belgium:
 Meer, Antwerp
 Meer, Belgian Limburg
 Meer, Flemish Brabant